David Michael Hogan (born 31 May 1989) is an English footballer who last played for Dagenham & Redbridge as a goalkeeper. He joined Dagenham & Redbridge in 2005, before being loaned out to non-League clubs Eastbourne Borough, Folkestone Invicta, Harlow Town, Thurrock and St Neots Town.

Career
Hogan joined Dagenham & Redbridge in 2005, having come through the Waltham Forest youth system. He made his debut on 3 September 2006, in Dagenham's 5–0 away win over Altrincham in the Conference National when he came on as a substitute for Tony Roberts. In August 2007, he was loaned out to Conference South club Eastbourne Borough, making one appearance in the 1–0 away win against Hampton & Richmond Borough on 11 August. He then joined Folkestone Invicta and Harlow Town on loan later in 2007.

In the 2008–09 season, Hogan made one more appearance for Dagenham in League Two. He replaced the injured Tony Roberts as a substitute against Gillingham on 13 April, in Dagenham's 2–1 loss at Priestfield. Hogan commented on his debut admitting he fulfilled a personal dream; "It was nice to get in and play at Gillingham, I've always wanted to play in the league and now I've done it". Hogan joined Conference South club Thurrock in September 2009, making his debut in the 2–1 home win against Weymouth on 13 September.

References

External links

1989 births
Living people
English footballers
English Football League players
Dagenham & Redbridge F.C. players
Eastbourne Borough F.C. players
Folkestone Invicta F.C. players
Harlow Town F.C. players
Potters Bar Town F.C. players
Tonbridge Angels F.C. players
Thurrock F.C. players
St Neots Town F.C. players
Aveley F.C. players
Association football goalkeepers
Bedfont Town F.C. players